Karl Werner may refer to:

 Karl Werner (theologian), Austrian theologian
 Karl Werner (footballer), German footballer
 Karl Werner (entomologist), German entomologist

See also
 Carl Werner, German watercolor painter
 Karl Verner, Danish linguist